Marat Maksutovich Makhmutov (born 3 September 1975) is a Russian former professional footballer.

Club career
He made his professional debut in the Russian Second Division in 1992 for FC Torpedo-d Moscow.

Honours
 Russian Premier League bronze: 2000.

European club competitions
 UEFA Cup 1996–97 with FC Torpedo-Luzhniki Moscow: 4 games.
 UEFA Intertoto Cup 1997 with FC Torpedo-Luzhniki Moscow: 3 games.
 UEFA Intertoto Cup 1998 with FC Shinnik Yaroslavl: 3 games.
 UEFA Cup 2000–01 with FC Torpedo Moscow: 1 game.
 UEFA Cup 2003–04 with FC Torpedo Moscow: 3 games.

References

1975 births
Footballers from Moscow
Living people
Russian footballers
Russia under-21 international footballers
Association football defenders
Russian Premier League players
Ukrainian Premier League players
FC Torpedo Moscow players
FC Torpedo-2 players
FC Chornomorets Odesa players
FC Shinnik Yaroslavl players
FC Rubin Kazan players
FC Ural Yekaterinburg players
Russian expatriate footballers
Expatriate footballers in Ukraine